Galitzkya is a genus of 3 species of flowering plants of family Brassicaceae, according to Appel, O. & Al-Shehbaz, I.  2003.

Named after Nikolai Petrovic Ikonnikov-Galitzky (1892—1942), Russian botanist.

It contains the following species:
 Galitzkya macrocarpa
 Galitzkya potaninii 
 Galitzkya spathulata

References

External links

Brassicaceae
Brassicaceae genera